RFA Tarbatness (A345) was a fleet stores ship of the Royal Fleet Auxiliary.

In 1981, the ship was bought by the United States Military Sealift Command to serve as USNS Spica (T-AFS-9).

Ships built on the River Tyne
Ships of the Royal Fleet Auxiliary
1967 ships
Ness-class combat stores ships
Ships built by Swan Hunter